Kotabaru Regency is one of the eleven regencies in the Indonesian province of South Kalimantan. It consists of two parts; the smaller but more populated part comprises Laut Island ("Sea Island"), the largest island off the coast of Kalimantan (Indonesian Borneo), together with the smaller Sebuku Island off Laut Island's east coast and even smaller islands nearby; the larger but less populated part consists of districts on the mainland of Kalimantan. The regency has an area of 9,442.46 km2, and had a population of 290,142 at the 2010 Census and 325,622 at the 2020 Census. The official estimate as at mid 2021 was 329,483. The regency seat is located at the large town of Kotabaru at the northern tip of Laut Island.

It has the second largest GRDP in the province after city of Banjarmasin, mainly due to its coal industry. It is also the largest regency by land area in the province.

History

Etymology 
The regency got its name from Kotabaru town, which is the administrative center of the regency. The town was previously a village that grew because of coal mining around 1873 and 1881. The coal mines were mostly owned by nobles of small kingdoms in the islands such as Pagatan and Kusan. The village grows into a town and called Kotta Baroe, which literally means "new town". Throughout 20th century until today, the region became commonly known as Kotabaru.

Early history 
In the region of what's now the regency, there were several petty kingdoms and sultanates which were closely tied to Sultanate of Banjar. It is estimated that these kingdoms came into existence around after 1786, following foundation Kusan and Pagatan Kingdom in the island of Laut by Prince Amir from Kingdom of Kayutangi  Both kingdoms were later on became subject to Kayutangi and obliged to pay tributaries. On 1840, Kusan and Pagatan entered a personal union after fourth king of Kusan, Jaya Sumitra, gave the kingdom to Arung Abdul Karim who was the king of Pagatan and assuming control over the entire island of Laut. On 1881, son of Jaya Sumitra, Prince Husin Kusuma took the title of fourth king of Laut Island. Husin Kusuma soon died in 1900 when taking a hajj and was succeeded by Prince Aminullah who would become the last king of Laut.

Colonial era 
In 1905, Dutch East Indies government declared the end of small kingdoms existence in the island following the defeat of Banjar Sultanate after Banjarmasin War. The region was then directly ruled by colonial government instead of getting through local kings and officials. In 1942, the region was occupied by Empire of Japan following World War II.

In the aftermath of the war and Indonesian National Revolution, returning Dutch proposed a puppet state of Southeast Borneo Federation in the region. This was opposed and conflicts erupted in the region, known as Kalimantan Physical Revolution. On 1 September 1945, Committee for Assisting Republic Indonesian (BPRI, Badan Pembantu Republik Indonesia) was formed in town of Pagatan and spread its branch to Laut island. On 6 December 1945, students and Republican militia declared a motion declaring the region part of Indonesian Republic. On 7 February 1946, a battle broke out between Republican militia and Dutch soldiers that tried to land in beach of Laut island around village of Kampung Baru.

Following the return of Dutch authority, several demonstrations were held in town of Pagatan and Kotabaru and Indonesian flag was hoisted in a wet market in Pagatan in October 1949. Southeast Borneo Federation were eventually dissolved by its own parliament and joined Indonesian Republic following transfer of sovereignty.

After independence 
The regency on its own came into existence in 1953, which made of administrative divisions in Laut Island, Southern Tanah Bumbu, Northern Tanah Bumbu, and Pasir Residency. However, Pasir Residency was cut off from the regency after division of Kalimantan into several provinces. Following fall of Suharto and rapid decentralization it follows, there has been demand from mainland districts to seceded from the regency and form their own. Tanah Bumbu was split off from the rest of Kotabaru Regency on 25 February 2003 and made into a separate regency. This process is caused by dissatisfaction from the regency government on Laut Island where the island is more developed than the mainland Kalimantan parts. This is however as of 2021 has not been materialized.

Geography

Climate
Kotabaru has a tropical rainforest climate (Af) with heavy rainfall year-round.

Governance

Administrative districts
At the time of the 2010 Census, Kotabaru Regency was divided into twenty districts (kecamatan), but an additional district (Pulau Laut Tanjung Selayar) was added subsequently from part of Pulau Laut Barat District, and then in 2020 a further district (Pulau Laut Sigam) was added from part of Pulau Laut Utara District (which includes the administrative capital, Kotabaru town). The districts are listed below with their areas and their populations at the 2010 Census and the 2020 Census, together with the official estimates as at mid 2021. The table also includes the locations of the district administrative centres, the number of administrative villages (rural desa and urban kelurahan) in each district, the number of (named) islands in each district, and its post code.

Local government 
It is a second-level administrative division equivalent to a city. As a regency, it is headed by a regent who is elected democratically. Head of districts are appointed directly by the regent with the recommendation of the regency secretary. Executive power lies with the regent and vice regent while legislative function is exercised by the regency's parliament.

Economy 
The GRDP of the Kotabaru Regency is valued at 23.79 trillion rupiahs on 2020, which is the second biggest in the province after Banjarmasin. Nominally, this was a decrease of 153.47 billion rupiahs from 2019 which were valued at 24.12 trillion rupiahs. The decrease was caused by deflation and economic downturn during COVID-19 pandemic as well as general decline of mining industry. The economy experienced contraction of 1.87% in 2020 compared to previous year.

The economy of the regency is undergoing a restructurization with general decline of primary sector and shift to tertiary sector as with many regions in Indonesia. This is mostly seen in 2020 where combined mining, agriculture, and fishery contributed to 37.25% of the regency's GRDP compared to 38.51% on 2016. As of 2020, the biggest single sector that contributed to the regency's GRDP was manufacturing with contribution of 33.80%. This followed by agriculture with 19.07%, mining with 18.18%, and transportation with 6.12%. The manufacturing industry consist mostly of food and drink-related industry as well as palm oil processing industry. There are significant amount of crude palm oil factories in the regency. Other than that, there are significant production of tobacco, textiles, furniture, and paper pulp.

The agriculture sector, which is the second biggest in the regency, is dominated by commodities such as palm oil plantation, maize, and rice. The third biggest sector in the regency is mining that is dominated by coal production as well as iron ore that are exported mostly to India and China.

Poverty rate as of 2020 was 4.22% and unemployment rate on 2020 was 4.96%.

Demographics 
The regency has population of 325,622 people on 2020, with average population growth of 1.08% from 2010 to 2020. North Laut Island district where the regency seat located is the most populated district with 90,234 people while the least populated district is North Kelumpang district with just 5,625 people. However, the most densely populated district is Sembilan Island district with density of 1,303.78 people per square kilometer while the least densely populated district is Hampang district with just 7.45 people per square kilometer.

The fastest growing district was West Kelumpang with 3.17% growth from 2010 to 2020, while the slowest was North Pamukan district with decline of 1.06% between 2010 and 2020. Sex ratio in the regency was 107, which means there are 107 male per 100 female population. This however varies from district to district, with Sembilan Island district the lowest with figure of 103.5 and the highest was Central Laut Island with figure of 111.7. As with most of other regions in Indonesia, the population is relatively young and economically active, numbering 157,363 people on 2020.

The majority of regency's population are Muslims, with figure of 299,910 people on 2020, followed by Protestants with 10,903, Catholics with 3,595, Buddhist with 2,513, Hindu with 1,916, and follower of folk religions numbering around 6,128. Life expectancy in the regency was 69.21 years which is slightly lower than provincial and national average.

Infrastructure

Education 
There are total 221 kindergartens, 267 elementary schools, 77 junior high schools, and 34 senior high schools. In addition, there are seven vocational high schools and three higher education institutions. All higher education institutions in the regency are private, which are Paris Barantai Teaching College, Kotabaru Polytech, and Darul Ulum Tarbiyah College. All of them are located in North Laut Island district around town of Kotabaru. The regency has a public library owned by regency government, which also located in town of Kotabaru. School participation rate in the regency was 98.86%.

Healthcare 
There's one hospital in the regency, 18 polyclinics, 66 puskesmas, and 12 pharmacies in the regency. The only hospital in the regency, Prince Jaya Sumitra Regional Hospital, is a public hospital owned and managed by the regency government. It is located in North Laut Island district in Kotabaru town, and classified as C-class hospital by Ministry of Health.

Transportation 
There are total 1,205 kilometers of road in the regency. Angkots are abundand in the town of Kotabaru as means to get around and regulated by regency government, divided into five fixed routes as of 2009. On 2020, the regency government allowed taxi and travel services from rural villages to run their service in the town. This decision was met with protest from drivers and owners from angkots in town due to fear of being outcompeted. Main port of the regency is Stagen Port, located in North Laut Island district and considered a regional hub. The regency is served by Gusti Syamsir Alam Airport.

Others 
There are 693 mosques in the regency, 25 churches, 8 Balinese temple, and 7 Chinese Buddhist temple.

References

Note list

External links 

 

Regencies of South Kalimantan